The Black Drin, or Black Drim is a river in North Macedonia and Albania. It flows out of Lake Ohrid in Struga, North Macedonia. After about  it crosses the border to Albania, west of Debar, North Macedonia. It merges with the White Drin in Kukës to form the Drin, which flows into the Adriatic Sea. It drains most of the eastern border region of Albania. The name is ancient - Drinius, Trinius (Pliny), Δρεῖνος (Ptolemy). Its origin is Illyrian from older *Drūn, from Indo-European *drū- into Old Indian drāvayate, run, flow, Avestan dru, run.

Agriculture 
This part of Albania is an agricultural-based site. The main agricultural products are corn and barley; silviculture is evolving, as well. The Ohrid trout, which is a form of salmon, can also be found in parts of the river at times.

References

Rivers of North Macedonia
Rivers of Albania
International rivers of Europe